Linda Barnes may refer to:

 Linda Barnes (writer) (born 1949), American mystery writer
 Linda Diane Barnes, American historian
 Linda L. Barnes (born 1953), American medical anthropologist

See also 
 Lynda Barnes (born 1967), American ten-pin bowler